Khvajeh Geri (also Romanized as Khvājeh Gerī; also known as Khadzha-Kiri, Khajeh Karī, Khoja Kiri, Khvāja Kiri, Khvājeh Karī, and Khvājeh Kerī) is a village in Saheli-ye Jokandan Rural District, in the Central District of Talesh County, Gilan Province, Iran. At the 2006 census, its population was 668, in 143 families.

Language 
Linguistic composition of the village.

References 

Populated places in Talesh County

Azerbaijani settlements in Gilan Province

Talysh settlements in Gilan Province